A Babysitter's Guide to Monster Hunting is a 2020 American dark fantasy comedy film directed by Rachel Talalay and distributed by Netflix. The film was written by Joe Ballarini and is based on his book trilogy of the same name. It stars Tom Felton, Indya Moore, Tamara Smart and Oona Laurence.

Plot
Kelly Ferguson is a babysitter on a mission to find the child in her care who has been kidnapped by the Boogeyman on Halloween night. She discovers a secret society of children-protecting babysitters exists, as does an entire world of monsters, which she must fight.

Cast

Release
The film premiered on Netflix on October 15, 2020.

Reception
On Metacritic, it has a weighted average score of 31 out of 100 based on 4 critic reviews, indicating "generally unfavorable reviews".

References

External links
 
 

2020 films
2020 horror films
American monster movies
Films about witchcraft
English-language Netflix original films
The Montecito Picture Company films
Walden Media films
Films directed by Rachel Talalay
Films produced by Ivan Reitman
Films scored by Matthew Margeson
Halloween horror films
2020s English-language films
2020s American films